Land Township may refer to the following townships in the United States:

 Land Township, Grant County, Minnesota
 Land Township, McHenry County, North Dakota